Shamzan may refer to:
 Shamzan-e Chah Bagh
 Shamzan-e Hiyet
 Shamzan-e Jehadiyeh